Telok Gong (Malaysia) is a Malaysian town in Alor Gajah District (a district of Malaysia), Melaka, Malaysia. This village in Malaysia is located near Masjid Tanah town which is also in Malaysia.

Infrastructure
 Telok Gong Power Station 1
 Telok Gong Power Station 2

References

Towns in Malacca